Conner Scott Menez (born May 29, 1995) is an American professional baseball pitcher for the Hokkaido Nippon-Ham Fighters of Nippon Professional Baseball (NPB). He played college baseball at The Master's University. He was drafted by the San Francisco Giants in the 14th round of the 2016 Major League Baseball draft and made his MLB debut with them in 2019.

Amateur career
Menez attended San Benito High School in Hollister, California. He then played college baseball at The Master's University from 2014 to 2016, where he had a 20–5 win–loss record and a 2.26 career earned run average (ERA), the lowest in school history.

Professional career

San Francisco Giants
He was drafted by the San Francisco Giants in the 14th round of the 2016 Major League Baseball draft. He signed for a $75,000 signing bonus.

Menez spent his first professional season with the Arizona League Giants, Salem-Keizer Volcanoes and San Jose Giants, pitching to a combined 4–1 record and 4.22 ERA in 53.1 innings pitched between the three teams. He pitched in 2017 with San Jose, going 7–7 with a 4.41 ERA in 23 games (22 starts), and in 2018 with San Jose, the Richmond Flying Squirrels and the Sacramento River Cats, compiling a combined 9–10 record with a 4.46 ERA in 28 total starts with 171 strikeouts in 135.1 innings (averaging 11.4 strikeouts per nine innings).

He started 2019 with Richmond and was promoted to Sacramento during the season. Between the two teams, in 2019 he was 6–4 with a 3.79 ERA in 23 games (22 starts) in which he pitched 121 innings and struck out 154 batters (averaging 11.5 strikeouts per nine innings).

On July 21, 2019, the Giants selected Menez's contract and promoted him to the major leagues. In his major league debut that day, he pitched five innings while allowing 2 runs and recording six strikeouts. In 2019 for the Giants he was 0–1 with a 5.29 ERA in eight games (three starts) covering 17 innings in which he struck out 22 batters.

In 2020 for the Giants, Menez pitched to a 2.38 ERA with 8 strikeouts in 11.1 innings of work.

On August 4, 2021, Menez was designated for assignment by the Giants. Menez was outrighted to Triple-A Sacramento on August 7.

Chicago Cubs
On December 8, 2021, the Chicago Cubs selected Menez in the minor league phase of the Rule 5 draft. He was assigned to the Triple-A Iowa Cubs to begin the 2022 season.

On May 9, 2022, Menez was selected to the 40-man and active rosters. After pitching a scoreless inning in a loss to the Arizona Diamondbacks, he was optioned back to Triple-A Iowa. On June 4, Menez was designated for assignment by Chicago after Caleb Kilian had his contract selected. He cleared waivers and was sent outright to Triple-A Iowa on June 6.

Hokkaido Nippon-Ham Fighters 
On June 24, 2022, Menez announced on his Instagram that he would be signing with the Hokkaido Nippon-Ham Fighters of the NPB. Fighters manager Tsuyoshi Shinjo said regarding Menez's acquisition that he may come to the NPB "in a week".

Personal life
Menez's grandfather is Bill Plummer, a former major league catcher, coach, and manager.

See also
Rule 5 draft results

References

External links

1995 births
Living people
People from Hollister, California
Baseball players from California
Major League Baseball pitchers
San Francisco Giants players
Chicago Cubs players
The Master's Mustangs baseball players
Arizona League Giants players
Salem-Keizer Volcanoes players
San Jose Giants players
Richmond Flying Squirrels players
Sacramento River Cats players
Hokkaido Nippon-Ham Fighters players